The Regina Margherita class was a class of two battleships built for the Italian Regia Marina between 1898 and 1905. The ships were designed by the latter's namesake, Benedetto Brin, who died before the ships were completed.

Both ships saw extensive service with the Italian fleet for the first decade of their careers. They saw action in the Italo-Turkish War of 1911–1912, where they participated in the seizure of Cyrenaica in North Africa and operations in the eastern Mediterranean Sea. They were reduced to training ships by World War I, and both ships were lost with heavy death tolls during the conflict. Benedetto Brin exploded in Brindisi in September 1915, and Regina Margherita struck a mine and sank in December 1916.

Design
After the negative experience with the preceding , which were too weak to engage foreign battleships, and too slow to catch cruisers, the Italian navy wanted a new battleship that returned to a larger, more effective size. In particular, they wanted to be able to challenge the new s being built in neighboring Austria-Hungary. They returned to the  gun that was standard in most other navies of the day, but sacrificed armor protection to achieve high speed. As such, the ships represented a hybrid type that merged the firepower of the slow battleships and the speed of a cruiser. Benedetto Brin initially wanted to arm the ships with only two of the 12-inch guns and twelve  guns, but after his death, Admiral Ruggero Alfredo Micheli altered the design to double the number of 12-inch guns, at the expense of eight of the medium-caliber pieces.

General characteristics and machinery

They displaced  at normal loading and at full combat load, Regina Margherita displaced  while Benedetto Brin, slightly heavier, displaced . Their hulls were equipped with a double bottom.

The vessels had a fairly large superstructure, which included an unusual pair of conning towers with bridges, one forward and one aft. The ships were built with a ram bow and had a raised forecastle deck. They had two masts, both with fighting tops; the foremast was located directly behind the forward conning tower and bridge. The ships' crew varied over the course of their careers, ranging from 812 to 900 officers and enlisted men.

The ships' propulsion system consisted of two triple-expansion steam engines, which drove a pair of screw propellers. Steam for the engines was provided by twenty-eight coal-fired water-tube Niclausse boilers in Regina Margherita. Benedetto Brin meanwhile was equipped with the same number of Belleville boilers. The boilers were vented into three funnels, two of which were placed side by side.

Armament and armor

The ships were armed with a main battery of four  40-caliber guns placed in two twin gun turrets, one forward and one aft. They were also equipped with a secondary battery of four  40-cal. guns in casemates in the superstructure at the corners, two firing forward and two astern. The ships carried a tertiary battery of twelve  40-cal. guns, also in casemates in the side of the hull. Close-range defense against torpedo boats was provided by a battery of twenty  40-cal. guns. The ships also carried a pair of  guns, two  guns, and two  Maxim guns. The Regina Margherita-class battleships were also equipped with four  torpedo tubes placed in the hull below the waterline.

The ships of the Regina Margherita class were protected with Harvey steel manufactured in Terni. The conning tower and the casemate guns were also protected by 6 in of armor plating. Coal was used extensively in the protection scheme, including a layer intended to protect the ships' internals from underwater damage.

Ships of the class

Service history

Both Regina Margherita and Benedetto Brin served in the active duty squadron for the first few years of their careers, and participated in the peacetime routine of fleet training. Regina Margherita frequently served as the fleet flagship before the completion of the new s. On 29 September 1911, Italy declared war on the Ottoman Empire, starting the Italo-Turkish War. The two ships saw action during the war in the 3rd Division in the 2nd Squadron. Benedetto Brin took part in the attack on Tripoli in October 1911, and both were involved in the campaign to seize Rhodes in the eastern Mediterranean Sea.

Italy initially remained neutral during World War I, but by 1915, had been convinced by the Triple Entente to enter the war against Germany and Austria-Hungary. Both the Italians and Austro-Hungarians adopted a cautious fleet policy in the confined waters of the Adriatic Sea, and so the two Regina Margherita-class battleships did not see action. Benedetto Brin served as a training ship based in Brindisi until she was destroyed in an internal explosion in the harbor on 27 September 1915 with heavy loss of life; 454 men of the ship's crew died in the explosion. Regina Margherita, also serving as a training ship, served for somewhat longer, until she struck a mine laid by the German submarine  on the night of 11–12 December 1916. Some 675 men were killed in the sinking.

Notes

References

Further reading

External links

 Regina Margherita (1901) Marina Militare website

Battleship classes